Strange News may refer to:
 Apology of Pierce Penniless; or. Strange News of the Intercepting Certain Letters, (1592), by Thomas Nashe
 Strange News from Another Star, a collection of eight short stories
 Strange News from the Angels, a New Zealand album